Spirit of the Glass is a 2004 Philippine supernatural horror film starring Rica Peralejo. The film was released on December 25, 2004, and was directed by Jose Javier Reyes.

A sequel entitled Spirit of the Glass 2: The Hunted was released in 2017.

Synopsis
The film follows a group of vacationers who inadvertently summon evil while using a Ouija board.

Cast
 Rica Peralejo as Kelly/Auring
 Marvin Agustin as Dante
 Dingdong Dantes as Choppy
 Paolo Contis as Drew
 Ciara Sotto as Cecille
 Drew Arellano as Anton
 Alessandra De Rossi as Myra
 Jake Cuenca as PJ
 Jill Yulo as young Adriana
 Jay Aquitania as Aries
 Cris Daluz as Mang Andoy
 Ana Capri as Ada
 Mark Gil as Carlos

Sequel
A sequel by the title Spirit of the Glass 2: The Hunted was released in the Philippines during November 2017. A reviewer for Rappler was critical of the movie, as they felt that the first film didn't require a sequel and that "The only thing really scary about 'Spirit of the Glass 2: The Haunted' is the amount of babble one has to endure to get anything out of the film".

References

External links
 

2004 films
2004 horror films
Philippine ghost films
Philippine supernatural horror films
OctoArts Films films
Filipino-language films
Films directed by José Javier Reyes